"Seether" is a 1994 single by American alternative rock band Veruca Salt.

Background
The song was written by Veruca Salt singer-guitarist Nina Gordon. "Seether" was more pop-sounding compared to the rest of the band's material. In a 1994 interview with Much Music, an interviewer suggested that "Seether" could either be about female "animalistic instincts" or bouts of rage. Gordon agreed that her songs' meanings often changed during and after the writing process. "You write a song, think it's about one thing for five minutes....and discover that it's about many different things and working on many different levels." In Veruca Salt's 1997 hit single "Volcano Girls," the seether was identified as "Louise," which presumably refers to Veruca Salt singer-guitarist Louise Post.

Release
Veruca Salt recorded the song in early 1994, with production by Brad Wood. They then released "Seether"/"All Hail Me" as their debut single on the independent label Minty Fresh. "Seether" quickly became popular on college and alternative radio stations. Its success led the band to record and release their debut album American Thighs, which included "Seether", later that year. Shortly thereafter, the band signed with the major label Geffen Records, which re-released the album. "Seether" peaked at number 8 on the Billboard Modern Rock Tracks chart, became a hit on MTV, and launched the band into fame.

Legacy and Reception
In 1994, the song was number 3 in British Radio One DJ John Peel's Festive Fifty. In a 2014 retrospective, music magazine Paste listed "Seether" at number 10 on their list of the 50 greatest grunge songs of all time.

Pitchfork called it, "bubblegrunge at its finest, all guitar fuzz and pop stickiness and crackling angst animating a personification of anger that just can't be leashed. "I try to cram her back in my mouth," co-frontwoman Nina Gordon sings in the verse, but she didn’t really try that hard.

Music video
The video features band members Nina Gordon, Louise Post, Jim Shapiro, and Steve Lack playing the song in front of the iconic shimmering red Randolph Street Gallery building when it was located at 756 N. Milwaukee Avenue in Chicago. The indoor shots of the band with cats roaming about and in acclimating cages were taken at Tree House Humane Society at their former location, 1212 W Carmen Street, Chicago. Tree House is a stray cat shelter and adoption center founded in 1971 and operating from that address until 2017.

Charts

Seether version
The band Seether named themselves after this song, and in 2013, recorded a cover of the song for their greatest hits album Seether: 2002–2013. It was released as a lead single to the compilation on September 3, 2013.

References

External links
Official artist website
Veruca Salt at Rolling Stone

1994 debut singles
1994 songs
Veruca Salt songs
Songs written by Nina Gordon